Below is a list of lieutenant governors of the U.S. state of California, 1849 to present. In California, the Lieutenant Governor and the Governor do not run together on the same ticket. The Lieutenant Governor can therefore be affiliated with a different political party than that of the Governor. Per the 1879 California Constitution, the Lieutenant Governor is the President of the State Senate.

List of lieutenant governors

Notes

References
General

 

Constitutions

Specific

Lieutenant Governor
California